Bite It is the debut album by Scottish rock band Whiteout, released in 1995 (see 1995 in music). The album includes two of the overall four previously released singles by the band, namely "No Time" and "Jackie's Racing". Another single, "Detroit", was not part of the original album but added as a bonus track to certain subsequent releases of Bite It, making "Starrclub" the only Whiteout single not released on a proper album (although it was re-released on the Japanese EP No Time). The album was available on both CD and vinyl.

Track listing 
All songs written by Carroll/Lindsay/Smith/Jones, except where noted.

 "Thirty Eight" – 4:04
 "No Time" – 3:50
 "We Should Stick Together" – 3:17
 "Jackie's Racing" – 3:18
 "Shine on You" – 4:32
 "No More Tears" (Lindsay/Cushnaghan/Carroll/Jones) – 6:42
 "Altogether" – 3:28
 "U Drag Me" – 4:56
 "Baby Don't Give Up on Me Yet" – 5:54
 "You Left Me Seeing Stars" – 5:08
 "Everyday" – 4:36
 "Untitled" – 5:45

There is a version of the album that contains a 13th track:
<LI>"Detroit" – 4:37

The Japanese edition features two additional tracks:

<LI>"Van Song" – 2:23
<LI>"Detroit" – 4:36

"Van Song" was also available as a limited 7-inch vinyl single backed with a cover version of the Rolling Stones' "Rocks Off". This single was never released commercially but given away as a promotional item. The first 100 concert attendees at each venue on Whiteout's tour in autumn of 1994 received the single for free.

Personnel 
 Andrew Jones – vocals
 Eric Lindsay – guitar, backing vocals
 Paul Carroll – bass, backing vocals
 Stuart Smith – drums

Additional personnel
 Lee Skelley – Hammond organ on "Shine on You"
 Phil Kane – piano on "Altogether", Hammond organ and piano on "No Time"
 Those Sweet Soul Swinging Singing Sisters Deborah & Maria - backing vocals on "Altogether"
 NFL Horns – brass on "Everyday"
 The Subway Soopa-Strinz – strings on "Untitled"

Production 
 Producer: Oransay Avenue (all tracks)
 Producer: Brian O'Shaughnessy (tracks 1, 3, 6, 8, 10, 11, 12)
 Producer: Kenny Paterson (tracks 2, 4, 7, 9, 12, 13)
 Producer: Sarah Bedingham (track 5)
 Mixer: Brian O'Shaughnessy
 Assistant engineer: Alex Jones (tracks 1, 3, 6, 8, 10)
 Assistant engineer: Jim Brumby (track 11)
 Cover design: George Miller
 Photography: Elaine Constantine
 Video stills: Douglas Hart, Momentum Video

Chart positions

Album

Singles

References 

1995 debut albums
Whiteout (band) albums